Perry Tuttle (born August 2, 1959) is a former American football wide receiver. He was a Clemson football standout in the early 1980s. His career continued into the National Football League (NFL) (Buffalo Bills, Tampa Bay Buccaneers, and Atlanta Falcons) and Canadian Football League (CFL) (Winnipeg Blue Bombers). Now, he is known for his inspirational speaking, sports marketing, and sports ministry.

Early life

Perry Warren Tuttle was born on August 2, 1959 in Lexington, North Carolina to Russell Samuel and Betty Mae Tuttle. He attended North Davidson High School and was a standout player throughout his high school career. His successes in high school led to his recruitment by Clemson University.

College life

The prime of Tuttle's football career was during his three seasons (1978-1981) at Clemson University. As of the 2018 season, Tuttle ranks ninth all-time in school history for touchdown receptions with 17, sixth all-time for receiving yards with 2,534, and tenth all-time for receptions with 150. Tuttle caught the winning touchdown pass in the 1982 Orange Bowl, which secured the national championship for the Tigers. His celebration after the touchdown catch in the third quarter, arms outstretched above his head with ball in hand, made the cover of the January 11, 1982 edition of Sports Illustrated with the caption, “Orange Bowl Hero Perry Tuttle of Clemson.” In 1991, Clemson added Tuttle to their Hall of Fame, and in 1996, he was named as a member of Clemson’s Centennial team. Later, in 1999, he was ranked by a panel of historians as the fourteenth-best player in Clemson football history.

NFL career

On April 27, 1982, Tuttle was selected in the first round (19th overall) of the NFL draft by the Buffalo Bills. Tuttle spent two seasons with the Bills, producing 24 receptions for 368 yards and three touchdowns. After his two seasons in with the Bills, his career in the NFL took a major decline; while in Atlanta, he only played in five games which led to only minimal stat production, one reception for seven yards.

CFL career

In 1986, Tuttle began his six-season career in the Canadian Football League with the Winnipeg Blue Bombers. Throughout his time with the Bombers, he caught 321 passes for 5,817 yards and 41 touchdowns. On November 25, 1990 at BC Place Stadium in Vancouver, the Bombers defeated the Edmonton Eskimos 50-11 to win the Grey Cup. In the third quarter of the game, Tuttle caught a 60-yard pass that later led to a five-yard touchdown catch. Two seasons after the Blue Bombers' championship win, Tuttle ended his football career and moved back to North Carolina (Charlotte). A few years after his retirement, Tuttle was once again recognized for his outstanding football talent with an induction into the Winnipeg Blue Bomber Hall of Fame.

Personal life
Tuttle's nephew Shy Tuttle plays in the NFL for the [{Carolina Panthers]] as a Defensive Tackle.

References

1959 births
Living people
American football wide receivers
Clemson Tigers football players
Buffalo Bills players
Atlanta Falcons players
Tampa Bay Buccaneers players
Winnipeg Blue Bombers players
People from Lexington, North Carolina
Players of American football from North Carolina